Henry Eduard Legler (June 22, 1861 – September 13, 1917) was an Italian American journalist, politician, and librarian. Born in Palermo, Sicily, Italy, His birth name was given as Enrico, Legler emigrated with his parents to the United States in 1869 and then settled in Milwaukee, Wisconsin in 1872. While in Wisconsin, Legler was a journalist. In 1889, Legler served in the Wisconsin State Assembly and was a Republican. From 1890 to 1894, Legler served as secretary of the Milwaukee School Board.

From 1904 to 1909, Legler served as secretary of the Wisconsin Library Commission. Then, from 1909 until his death in 1917, Leger served as librarian of the Chicago Public Library. Legler also served as president of the American Library Association in 1912 and 1913. Legler also served as curator of the Wisconsin Historical Society and had written several books and articles about history. Legler died in Chicago, Illinois.

Bibliography
 Library Ideals (Open Court Publishing, 1918)
 Of much love and some knowledge of books (Caxton Club, 1912)
 Books for the People (1908)
 Leading Events of Wisconsin History: The Story of the State (Sentinel Company, 1898)

References

External links
 
 
 

 
 

1861 births
1917 deaths
Italian emigrants to the United States
Politicians from Chicago
Politicians from Milwaukee
Politicians from Palermo
Journalists from Wisconsin
Writers from Chicago
Writers from Milwaukee
Presidents of the American Library Association
School board members in Wisconsin
American librarians
19th-century American politicians
American people of Italian descent
Chicago Public Library
Republican Party members of the Wisconsin State Assembly